Naomi Schiff (born 18 May 1994) is a Rwandan and Belgian racing driver and television presenter. She was born in Belgium, to a Belgian father and Rwandan mother, grew up in South Africa, and now lives in the United Kingdom.

In 2020, Schiff was appointed as the diversity and inclusion ambassador for the W Series, and in 2022 she became a presenter for Sky Sports.

Career
Schiff began her career in single-seater racing cars at age 16 in 2010 in the Southern African Formula Volkswagen. She finished that season in 17th place with seven points. In 2011, she took part in four races in the Bridgestone Special Open trophy. She drove for the CK Racing team but was not classified.

After a year's break from racing, Schiff appeared in the team RC Formula during a round on the track Ciudad del Motor de Aragón European Cup Formula Renault 2.0. Similarly, she appeared at the start of Supercar Challenge Superlights - SR3 in GH Motorsport team.

Schiff won the 2014 Clio Cup China Series with 135 points. That same year she also competed in the 24 Hours of Zolder. The following year she won the KTM X-Bow GT4 with teammate Reinhard Kofler.

In 2018, she competed in the 24 Hours of Nürburgring, finishing 2nd in her class of 3.

In February 2022, she presented the Mercedes AMG Petronas F1 Team car launch for the Mercedes W13 alongside Natalie Pinkham. The following month, she was announced as co-presenter on a new Sky Sports F1 show Any Driven Monday and is part of the 2022 Sky Sports F1 team.

Racing record

Career Summary

† Guest driver ineligible to score points

Complete W Series results
(key) (Races in bold indicate pole position) (Races in italics indicate fastest lap)

References

1994 births
Living people
Sportspeople from Antwerp
Belgian racing drivers
Belgian people of Rwandan descent
W Series drivers
Asian Formula Renault Challenge drivers
Formula Renault Eurocup drivers
Nürburgring 24 Hours drivers
Rwandan sportswomen
RC Formula drivers
24H Series drivers
GT4 European Series drivers
Belgian female racing drivers
Rwandan expatriate sportspeople in South Africa
Rwandan expatriate sportspeople in the United Kingdom
Belgian expatriate sportspeople in South Africa
Belgian expatriate sportspeople in the United Kingdom